Janczyk is a Polish surname. Notable people with the surname include:

 Dawid Janczyk (born 1987), Polish footballer
 Wiesław Jańczyk (born 1931), Polish footballer
 Roman Jańczyk (1903–1980), Polish footballer
 Neil Janczyk (born 1983), Scottish footballer

See also
 

Polish-language surnames